Młada Hora  is a village in the administrative district of Gmina Ujsoły, within Żywiec County, Silesian Voivodeship, in southern Poland, close to the border with Slovakia.

Location

Population
The village has a population of 40.

References

Villages in Żywiec County